The 1981 Speedway World Team Cup was the 22nd edition of the FIM Speedway World Team Cup to determine the team world champions.

The final took place at the Olching Speedwaybahn in Olching, West Germany. Denmark won their second title. Ominously for the rest of the world the team contained a youthful Hans Nielsen and Erik Gundersen.

Qualification

Round 1
 May 17
  Reading, Smallmead Stadium
 Referee:  C. Ringstrom
 Att: 7,000

* England & USA to Intercontinental Final

Round 2
 May 28
  Tampere, Tampere Stadium

* Denmark & Sweden to Intercontinental Final

Round 3
 May 17
  Brokstedt, Holsteinring Brokstedt

* West Germany & Netherlands to Continental Semi-Final

Round 4
 May 17
  Debrecen

* Soviet Union & Hungary to Continental Semi-Final

Tournament

Continental Semifinal
 June 28
  Badia Polesine

* Soviet Union & West Germany to Continental Final

Continental Final
 July 11
  Leningrad

* West Germany & Soviet Union to World Final

Intercontinental Final
 July 28
  King's Lynn, Norfolk Arena
 Referee:  Sam Bass

* Denmark & England to World Final

World Final
 August 16
  Olching, Olching Speedwaybahn
 Referee:  C. Bergstrom

See also
 1981 Individual Speedway World Championship
 1981 Speedway World Pairs Championship

References

1981
World T